Aeolochroma rhodochlora is a moth of the family Geometridae first described by Gilbert M. Goldfinch in 1929. It is found in New South Wales, Australia.

References

Moths described in 1929
Pseudoterpnini
Moths of Australia